Zirconia is an unincorporated community in Henderson County, North Carolina, United States. Zirconia has a post office with ZIP code 28790, which opened on June 9, 1853. The community was named for the valuable deposits of zircon in the area.

References

Unincorporated communities in Henderson County, North Carolina
Unincorporated communities in North Carolina